Silke Lichtenhagen (born 20 November 1973 in Leverkusen) is a retired German sprinter.

She competed for TSV Bayer Leverkusen, training under Manfred Fink (1988–1994) and Wolfgang Thiele (1995–1998).  She represented Germany at the 1996 Atlanta Olympics.

Achievements

Personal bests
60 m: 7.23 s (1997) 
100 m: 11.24 s (1996) 
200 m: 22.73 s (1994)

References

1973 births
Living people
German female sprinters
Athletes (track and field) at the 1996 Summer Olympics
Olympic athletes of Germany
World Athletics Championships medalists
European Athletics Championships medalists
Olympic female sprinters
Sportspeople from Leverkusen